Stylidium tenerum, the swamp triggerplant, is a dicotyledonous plant that belongs to the genus Stylidium (family Stylidiaceae) that was described by Curt Polycarp Joachim Sprengel in 1826. Robert Brown had described this species in 1810 under the name S. tenellum, a name which had already been used for another species in 1805 by Olof Swartz. To add to the confusion, Rica Erickson had described and illustrated this taxon in 1958 under the name S. uliginosum, another currently accepted name for a related species.

S. tenerum is an erect annual plant that grows from 3 to 20 cm tall. Obovate or orbicular leaves, about 4-10 per plant, form basal rosettes. The leaves are generally 4–17.5 mm long and 3–8 mm wide. This species generally has one to seven scapes and cymose inflorescences that are 3–20 cm long. Flowers are white. S. tenerum has a wide distribution ranging from eastern Queensland and extreme northeastern New South Wales up to the Wessel Islands of the Northern Territory in Australia and has even been located in Papua New Guinea. Its typical habitats include the sandy soils of creekbanks, seepage areas, and coastal lowlands in open Melaleuca communities. It flowers in the southern hemisphere from April to October.

See also 
 List of Stylidium species

References 

Carnivorous plants of Australia
Carnivorous plants of Asia
Flora of Queensland
Flora of New South Wales
Flora of the Northern Territory
Flora of Papua New Guinea
tenerum
Asterales of Australia